"Uneventful Days" is a song by the American musician Beck. It was released on October 17, 2019, as the second single from his fourteenth studio album Hyperspace.

Music video
Dev Hynes directed the music video for "Uneventful Days". Rolling Stone described the song's music video as surreal. The music video contains references to Beck's past music videos, including "Devils Haircut" (1996) and "Sexx Laws" (1999), and stars Evan Rachel Wood, Tessa Thompson and Alia Shawkat.

Charts

Weekly charts

Year-end charts

References

2019 singles
2019 songs
Beck songs
Songs written by Beck
Songs written by Pharrell Williams